Swati Singh (born 2 October 1987) is an Indian weightlifter who won the bronze medal in the women's 53 kg weight class at the 2014 Commonwealth Games at Glasgow. Singh had originally finished fourth but the gold medal winner Chika Amalaha of Nigeria failed a drug test, elevating Singh to bronze medal position. In 2019 she tested positive for Morphine and was banned until 2021 by the International Weightlifting Federation.

References

External links
 http://results.glasgow2014.com/athlete/weightlifting/1040490/s_singh.html
 https://www.pressreader.com/india/hindustan-times-lucknow-live/20170514/281659664965697

Living people
Indian female weightlifters
1987 births
Sportswomen from Uttar Pradesh
Sportspeople from Varanasi
Commonwealth Games bronze medallists for India
Weightlifters at the 2014 Commonwealth Games
Commonwealth Games medallists in weightlifting
21st-century Indian women
21st-century Indian people
Weightlifters from Uttar Pradesh
20th-century Indian women
Medallists at the 2014 Commonwealth Games